Jeanette Mary Barker (née Laws, born ) is a New Zealand diver who represented her country at the 1954 British Empire and Commonwealth Games. In more recent years she has competed in international masters swimming and diving championships.

Early life and diving career
Born Jeanette Mary Laws, Barker was born in about 1933, and educated at Napier Girls' High School. She started diving when she was at intermediate school, and competed in both swimming and diving until she was 15 years old, when she decided to concentrate on the latter. After she left school, Laws spent two years living in Auckland and Dunedin where she received specialist diving coaching, while working in accounting.

Representing Hawke's Bay, Laws went on to win the New Zealand national women's diving championship five times—in 1951 and then in four consecutive years from 1953 to 1956—as well as the national women's tower diving title in 1954 and 1955. At the 1954 British Empire and Commonwealth Games in Vancouver, Laws finished fifth in the women's 3 m springboard, and fourth in the women's 10 m platform diving events.

Later life
Later in the 1950s, Laws retired from diving to marry Peter Barker and raise a family. She ran her own swimming school for eight years, and returned to competitive swimming and diving in the 1980s, competing at six FINA World Masters Championships.

References

1930s births
Living people
Sportspeople from Napier, New Zealand
People educated at Napier Girls' High School
New Zealand female divers
Commonwealth Games competitors for New Zealand
Divers at the 1954 British Empire and Commonwealth Games
New Zealand female swimmers